Vicente Grau Juan (born 6 April 1968 in València) is a professional Valencian pilota player known as Grau. He plays mainly Escala i corda matches and is one of the best mitgers (midfield) playing for the ValNet company, due to his fast and strong ball-strikes (bot-de-braç and volea), he has been the first mitger who won the Trofeu Individual Bancaixa, a competition for dauers. He has been a recurrent member of the Valencian Pilota Squad, attaining many prizes, specially the "World's best player" twice.

Trophies 
 Winner of the Campionat Professional de Galotxa 1990 and 1991
 Winner of the Campionat Nacional d'Escala i Corda 1993
 Runner-up of the Campionat Nacional d'Escala i Corda 1991
 Winner of the Trofeu Individual Bancaixa 2000
 Runner-up of the Trofeu Individual Bancaixa 1996 and 1997

Handball International Championships
 Winner of the 5 Nations Llargues Championship, València 1993
 Winner of the European Llargues Championship, Imperia (Italy) 1999
 Winner of the Llargues World Championship, València 1996
 Winner of the Llargues World Championship, Maubeuge (France) 1998
 Winner of the Llargues World Championship, València 2000
 Winner of the International game World Championship, Netherlands 2001
 Runner-up of the Llargues European Championship, Netherlands 2001
 Best World player, Maubeuge (France) 1998
 Best World player, Imperia (Italy) 1999

References

1968 births
Living people
Sportspeople from Valencia
Pilotaris from the Valencian Community